"Sundown" is a song by Canadian folk artist Gordon Lightfoot, from the titular album, released as a single in March 1974.

"Sundown" reached No. 1 on the U.S. Billboard Hot 100 and easy listening charts and No. 13 on the Hot Country singles chart, as well as No. 1 in Canada on RPMs national singles chart. It was Lightfoot's only single to reach No. 1 on the Hot 100.

Content
The song's lyrics seem to describe a troubled romantic relationship (often cited as Cathy Smith), with the narrator recounting an affair with a "hard-loving woman [who's] got me feeling mean".

In a 2008 interview, Lightfoot said:

Chart performance

Weekly charts

Year-end charts

Other versions
 Scott Walker covered the song on his 1974 album We Had It All.
 Nana Mouskouri recorded a French version, "L'Amour, c'est comme l'été", on her 1974 album Que Je Sois Un Ange.
 Los Angeles alternative hard rock band Claw Hammer covered the song on its 1990 self-titled album.
 The musical project/collaboration of singer-songwriters Elwood covered the song in 2000. This version peaked at No. 33 on the Billboard Modern Rock Tracks chart on July 8, 2000.
 American country music singer Deryl Dodd's version of the song peaked at #59 on Billboards Hot Country Singles & Tracks chart in 1999. It was later included on his album, Pearl Snaps (2002).
 American-Canadian country artist Jesse Winchester covered this on Beautiful: A Tribute to Gordon Lightfoot (2003).
 Country singer Toby Keith included a live cover version on the deluxe edition of his album Bullets in the Gun (2010).
 Canadian rock musician Luke Doucet covered it on the album Steel City Trawler (2010).
 French singing duo Marie-Ève Janvier and Jean-François Breau covered the song in French as "L'amour c'est comme l'été", on the compilation album Quand le country dit bonjour... (2012).
 Ed Kuepper covered the song, including it on his greatest hits album.

Personnel
Engineered by Lee Herschberg 
Recorded at Eastern Sound Studios, Toronto, Ontario, Canada.

Gordon Lightfoot: Lead and background vocals, 12-string guitar
Red Shea: Lead electric guitar
Terry Clements: Lead acoustic guitar
John Stockfish: Bass
Jim Gordon: Drums

In other media
"Sundown" is featured in the movies Knives Out and The Beach Bum.
"Sundown" is featured in the Mission Hill episode "Unemployment Part 1 (or Brother's Big Boner)".
"Sundown" is the ending song of The Blacklist season 1, episode 13: "The Cyprus Agency (No. 64)" (January 27, 2014). It also appears in the season 4 episode, "Philomena."
The song entered the Amazon UK chart at number 97 on 18 March 2014, after The Blacklist episode, "The Cypress Agency (No. 64)" was shown on UK television.
"Sundown" is featured after the opening credits of Supernatural Season 10, Episode 5 "Fan Fiction" (November 11, 2014).
The lyrics of "Sundown" were referenced in the Strong Bad Email episode "army" where, after unsuccessfully trying to enlist Strong Bad in the Homestarmy, Homestar Runner remarks "we'll see if those trees you're always hugging save you when Gordon Lightfoot's creeping round your back stair."

See also 
List of Hot 100 number-one singles of 1974 (U.S.)
List of number-one adult contemporary singles of 1974 (U.S.)
List of RPM number-one singles of 1974

References

External links
 

1974 songs
1974 singles
Gordon Lightfoot songs
Deryl Dodd songs
Billboard Hot 100 number-one singles
Cashbox number-one singles
Reprise Records singles
RPM Top Singles number-one singles
Number-one singles in South Africa
Song recordings produced by Lenny Waronker
Songs written by Gordon Lightfoot